Inner centromere protein is a protein that in humans is encoded by the INCENP gene.

In mammalian cells, two broad groups of centromere-interacting proteins have been described: constitutively binding centromere proteins and 'passenger' (or transiently interacting) proteins. The constitutive proteins include CENPA (centromere protein A), CENPB, CENPC1, and CENPD.

The term 'passenger proteins' encompasses a broad collection of proteins that localize to the centromere during specific stages of the cell cycle. These include CENPE; MCAK; KID; cytoplasmic dynein (e.g., DYNC1H1); CliPs (e.g. CLIP1); and CENPF/mitosin (CENPF). The inner centromere proteins (INCENPs), the initial members of the passenger protein group, display a broad localization along chromosomes in the early stages of mitosis but gradually become concentrated at centromeres as the cell cycle progresses into mid-metaphase. During telophase, the proteins are located within the midbody in the intercellular bridge, where they are discarded after cytokinesis.

INCENP is a regulatory protein in the chromosome passenger complex. It is involved in regulation of the catalytic protein Aurora B. It performs this function in association with two other proteins - Survivin and Borealin. These proteins form a tight three-helical bundle. The N-terminal domain of INCENP is the domain involved in formation of this three-helical bundle.

Interactions
INCENP has been shown to interact with H2AFZ, Survivin and CDCA8. The ARK binding region has been found to be necessary and sufficient for binding to aurora-related kinase. This interaction has been implicated in the coordination of chromosome segregation with cell division in yeast.

References

Further reading

Protein families